Champion is a 1949 American drama film noir sport film directed by Mark Robson with a screenplay written by Carl Foreman based on a short story by Ring Lardner, and starring Kirk Douglas, Marilyn Maxwell and Arthur Kennedy. The picture recounts the struggles of boxer "Midge" Kelly fighting his own demons while working to achieve success in the boxing ring. Cinematography by Franz Planer.  The supporting cast features Paul Stewart, Ruth Roman and Lola Albright.

The film won an Academy Award for Best Film Editing and gained five other nominations as well, including a Best Actor for Douglas.

Several clips from the film were used in Douglas' 1999 film Diamonds to illustrate his character's career as a boxer.

Plot
The drama charts the story of Michael "Midge" Kelly (Kirk Douglas), a boxer who pushes himself to the top of his game by knocking out opponents and back-stabbing his friends. He has no qualms about deceiving the various females he encounters and he eventually double-crosses Tommy Haley (Paul Stewart), the manager who found him and helped pave his road to fame.

Midge and his brother Connie (Arthur Kennedy) are crossing America by thumb and freight cars from Chicago to California, where they have bought a share in a restaurant. Along the way, they hitch a lift from a car carrying a top boxer, Johnny Dunne, and his girlfriend Grace Diamond (Marilyn Maxwell). They are driven to Kansas City where Dunne is fighting another contender that night.

Midge needs money and is offered a fight on the under-card for $35. After taking a beating, the promoter only pays him $10, claiming the remainder as "management and facility fees". The fight brings him to the attention of fight trainer Tommy Haley, who tells a disinterested Midge to come to his gym in Los Angeles if he ever needs a break.

Once they reach Los Angeles, however, they discover they have been conned in the restaurant deal. The brothers need to secure jobs waiting tables and washing dishes. Both strike up a relationship with the owner's daughter, Emma (Ruth Roman). When Midge is discovered with her, they are forced to marry by her outraged father. After the shotgun wedding, Midge abandons his new wife and flees with his brother to Haley's gym.

Midge enters his new field with a single-minded devotion. He defeats a number of local fighters, begins touring the country and is soon ranked as a contender. He is matched with Dunne, who is in line for a championship fight. Organized crime figures lean on Midge to throw the match, guaranteeing him a legitimate shot at the title the following year if he complies. Midge agrees, but then goes back on his word and destroys the complacent Dunne in a single round.

Seeing which way the wind is blowing, Grace now attaches herself to Midge, and persuades him to abandon his manager Haley and take on the management of Jerome Harris, an extremely wealthy and influential figure in the fight game with criminal ties. Realizing this is the only way he will get a shot at the title, Midge agrees. Connie is so disgusted that he walks out. He reconnects with Emma and convinces her to return to Chicago with him to help care for his aged and ailing mother.

Midge takes the title and becomes a popular fan favorite because of his rise from humble beginnings. He soon becomes involved with the wife of his new manager, Palmer Harris, a sculptor. She falls in love with him and persuades Midge to ask her husband for a divorce. Jerome refuses and instead offers Midge a large sum of money if he relinquishes his wife. Midge agrees, leaving Palmer brokenhearted.

After fighting a number of second-rate challengers, Midge agrees to fight Dunne, who is now in good shape and making a comeback. Midge quickly realizes he need to get in top shape in order to win, so he rehires Haley as his manager, and Connie and Emma come back into the camp as well. Connie and Emma are now contemplating marriage, although Emma is still legally married to Midge. As they are breaking camp, Midge beds Emma, just to show he can.

Midge fights Dunne in the sporting event of the year. He knocks down the challenger in the first round. Dunne manages to get up and the balance of the fight shifts in his direction. He starts pounding Midge, pummeling his face. Haley tries to throw in the towel, but Midge refuses and fights on, taking more punishment. After seeing Grace in the audience, Midge, now enraged, rallies in the final round and knocks out Dunne, but he is seriously injured and dies in his locker room of a cerebral hemorrhage.

After delivering a favorable, but backhanded, eulogy to a reporter, Connie and Emma walk off into the darkness, now free to move forward with their lives.

Cast
 Kirk Douglas as Midge Kelly
 Marilyn Maxwell as Grace 
 Arthur Kennedy as Connie 
 Paul Stewart as Haley
 Ruth Roman as Emma 
 Lola Albright as Palmer 
 Luis van Rooten as Harris
 Harry Shannon as Lew 
 John Daheim as Dunne (as John Day)
 Ralph Sanford as Hammond
 Esther Howard as Mrs. Kelly

Until his death in 2020 at age 103, Kirk Douglas was the last surviving cast member.

Production
The film was shot in twenty days.

RKO sued the filmmakers claiming similarities between this film and The Set Up.

Reception

Box office
The film opened at the Globe Theatre in New York City on April 9, 1949 and grossed $41,000 in its opening week.

Critical response
When the film was released, Bosley Crowther, the film critic for The New York Times, believed the drama was not exactly faithful to the original Lardner story, which had a very hard-edge.  Still, he gave the boxing drama a positive review, and wrote, "However, Director Mark Robson has covered up story weaknesses with a wealth of pictorial interests and exciting action of a graphic, colorful sort. His scenes in training gymnasiums, managers' offices and, of course, the big fight rings are strongly atmospheric and physically intense. Except that the fighting is more furious than one can credit, it is virtually all right. As the hero and "Champion", Kirk Douglas does a good, aggressive job, with a slight inclination to over-eagerness at times, which might amuse an old fight fan. Arthur Kennedy is dour as his crippled brother who distrusts the slaughterous sport, and Marilyn Maxwell, Ruth Roman and Lola Albright are attractive as the "champ's" various girls. Paul Stewart is most convincing as a quiet, hard-bitten manager. If one hasn't already seen the recently memorable "Body and Soul" which might have served as a model for "Champion", this is a stinging fight film to see. If one has seen that other, this will look a little pale."

The staff at Variety magazine gave the picture a good review and also noted the difference between the screenplay and the original story.  They wrote, "Adapted from a Ring Lardner short story of the same title, Champion is a stark, realistic study of the boxing rackets and the degeneracy of a prizefighter. Fight scenes, under Franz Planer's camera, have realism and impact. Unrelenting pace is set by the opening sequence. Cast, under Mark Robson's tight direction, is fine. Kirk Douglas is the boxer and he makes the character live. Second honors go jointly to Arthur Kennedy, the fighter's crippled brother, and Paul Stewart as the knowing manager."

The review aggregator Rotten Tomatoes reported that 92% of critics gave the film a positive review, based on thirteen reviews.

Accolades
Wins
 Academy Award for Film Editing  – (Harry W. Gerstad)
 Golden Globe Award for Best Cinematography – (Franz Planer)

Nominations
  Directors Guild of America Award for Outstanding Directorial Achievement in Motion Pictures – (Mark Robson)
 Academy Award for Best Actor – (Kirk Douglas)
 Academy Award for Best Supporting Actor – (Arthur Kennedy)
 Golden Globe Award for Most Promising Newcomer – Female – (Ruth Roman)
 Academy Award for Best Cinematography, Black-and-White – (Franz Planer)
 Academy Award for Original Music Score – (Dimitri Tiomkin)
 Academy Award for Writing Adapted Screenplay – (Carl Foreman)
 WGA for Best Written American Drama  – (Carl Foreman)

Others

The film is recognized by American Film Institute in these lists:
 2001: AFI's 100 Years...100 Thrills – Nominated
 2005: AFI's 100 Years...100 Movie Quotes:
 Michael Kelly: "For the first time in my life, people cheering for me. Were you deaf? Didn't you hear 'em? We're not hitchhiking any more. We're riding." – Nominated

Radio adaptation 
Champion was presented on Screen Directors Playhouse on NBC on March 17, 1950, with Douglas reprising his role from the film.

References

External links

 
 
 
 
 

1949 films
1940s sports drama films
American sports drama films
American black-and-white films
American boxing films
Film noir
Films scored by Dimitri Tiomkin
Films based on short fiction
Films directed by Mark Robson
Films whose editor won the Best Film Editing Academy Award
United Artists films
Films with screenplays by Carl Foreman
Films produced by Stanley Kramer
1949 drama films
1940s English-language films
1940s American films